Thomas Summers West  (18 November 1927 – 9 January 2010) was a British chemist.

Life

Early years
He was born in 1927 in Peterhead, Scotland and educated at Old Tarbat Public School in Portmahomack and then Tain Royal Academy. He then studied chemistry and obtained a BSc degree at Aberdeen University.

He married Margaret Officer Lawson in 1952 and had three children, Ann (Cochennec, Yvon), Ruth (Byrd) and Tom.

Scientific career

He moved to Birmingham University in 1949 to carry out research in analytical chemistry under Professor Ron Belcher and obtained his PhD in 1952 and his D.Sc in 1962. In 1956 he was awarded the Meldola Medal and Prize of the Royal Society of Chemistry for advances in chemistry. In 1963 he moved to Imperial College in London as Reader in Analytical Chemistry and became Professor of Analytical Chemistry at Imperial College in 1965. He established a world-famous research team that included Roy Dagnall, Gordon Kirkbright and Bernard Fleet who were pioneers in the field of analytical atomic absorption spectroscopy and atomic fluorescence spectroscopy.

He became Director of the Macaulay Institute for Soil Research in 1975 retiring in 1987 and also became a Fellow of the Royal Society of Edinburgh in 1979. During this period he worked on a number of Royal Commissions and was Chairman of the Scientific Committee of Sir John May's investigation into the IRA Woolwich and Guildford bombings from 1991 to 1993. He also served as Chairman of Panels I and III on the Royal Society, International Relations Committee during the 1990s.

Awards and accolades

In 1987 he was appointed a CBE and made Emeritus Professor of Chemistry at Aberdeen University having been an Honorary Professor of Aberdeen University between 1983 and 1987. He was President of the International Union of Pure and Applied Chemistry (IUPAC) between 1977 and 1979 and its Secretary General between 1983 and 1991. He was also President of the Society for Analytical Chemistry between 1969 and 1971, and Honorary Secretary of the Chemical Society between 1972 and 1975.

In March 1989 he was elected a Fellow of the Royal Society. The citation on his application read: "Distinguished for his contributions to analytical atomic and molecular spectroscopy. His early work at Birmingham on molecular spectroscopic studies of analytical chelate chemistry was of great importance and included his interpretation of the only known positive colour reaction of the fluoride ion. This reaction has replaced all other spectrophotometric reactions for fluoride. His evolution of the unique conditionally specific reaction between calcium and a new specially synthesised trihydroxytrisazo clathrate cage dyestuff molecule was also outstanding. His work on quartz fibre torsion ultramicrobalances and thereafter on a complete system of ultramicroscopic organic elemental and functional group analysis is also notable. At Imperial College, he created a new research group to work on analytical atomic absorption and atomic fluorescence spectroscopy. Under West's leadership this group very quickly became established as a leading centre of research in these fields. His many contributions included those to electrothermal methods of atomisation, microwave-excited atomic spectral lamps, low-luminosity flames, and atom-trapping techniques. At Aberdeen he has continued work in these fields. He has also contributed to the use of piezo-electric crystal sensor systems for the measurement of minute traces of airborne pollutants. He has collaborated in work on bio-significant and toxic trace elements in the soil-plant ecosystem and on acidification phenomena. West has served widely on many national and international committees and is at present Secretary-General of the International Union of Pure and Applied Chemistry."

Death and legacy

He died in Lincoln County Hospital on 9 January 2010 of heart failure; his wife Margaret died the following day, also in Lincoln County Hospital, from cancer.

In 2012 the Royal Society of Chemistry created the Tom West Analytical Fellowship in recognition of his contribution to analytical chemistry and the first award went to Dr Toby Athersuch in July 2013, presented by two of Professor West's children, Ruth Byrd and Tom West.

Publications

He was an editor and publisher of Scientific books and articles including 408 articles in scientific journals around the world between 1951 and 1986 either in his own name or co-written with fellow chemists as well as books that include;
New Methods of Analytical Chemistry in association with R Belcher from Birmingham University and C.L. Wilson from Belfast University, 1955.
Complexometry with EDTA and related reagents, 1969.
Analytical Chemistry 1973.

References

Sources

1927 births
2010 deaths
People from Peterhead
People from Tain
People educated at Tain Royal Academy
British chemists
Fellows of the Royal Society
Fellows of the Royal Society of Edinburgh
Academics of the University of Aberdeen
Alumni of the University of Aberdeen
Alumni of the University of Birmingham
Academics of Imperial College London
Academics of the University of Birmingham